Miguel Roa (Madrid, 1944 – Illescas, 2016) was a Spanish conductor. He was particularly associated with the zarzuela, and joined the Teatro de la Zarzuela in 1978, becoming director in 1985.

Selected discography
 Tomás Bretón: Andalusian Scenes; In the Alhambra; Opera Preludes. Orquesta de la Comunidad de Madrid. Miguel Roa (Naxos, 2008)
 Joaquín Rodrigo: El hijo fingido. Comedia lírica en un prólogo y dos actos. Miguel Roa (2002)
 Preludes and Choruses from Zarzuelas (Naxos, 2003)
 Manuel Penella: El gato montés Teresa Berganza Plácido Domingo . Coro Titular Del Teatro Lírico Nacional la Zarzuela, Madrid Symphony Orchestra Miguel Roa (2CD DGG, 1998)
 Pasión española: coplas. Plácido Domingo, Orquesta de la Comunidad de Madrid.  Miguel Roa (DGG, 2008)
 Amadeo Vives: Doña Francisquita, Ainhoa Arteta, Plácido Domingo, Linda Mirabal. Cordoba Grand Theatre Chorus, Seville Symphony Orchestra Miguel Roa

References

Spanish conductors (music)
Male conductors (music)
1944 births
Musicians from Madrid
2016 deaths
20th-century conductors (music)
20th-century Spanish musicians
20th-century Spanish male musicians
21st-century conductors (music)
21st-century Spanish musicians
21st-century male musicians